The 2019 Dixie State Trailblazers football team represented Dixie State University (now Utah Tech University) in the 2019 NCAA Division II football season. They were led by first-year head coach Paul Peterson and played their home games at Greater Zion Stadium in St. George, Utah as a member of the Rocky Mountain Athletic Conference.

The Trailblazers' eight wins set a new program record.

Previous season
The Trailblazers finished the 2018 NCAA Division II football season 7–4 overall and 7–3 in RMAC play to finish in a tie for third.

Schedule

References

Dixie State
Utah Tech Trailblazers football seasons
Dixie State Football